The Madushan Dam is a gravity dam on the Honghe (Red) River in Honghe Hani and Yi Autonomous Prefecture of Yunnan Province.

The name of the dam comes from the nearby village of Madushan, located on the left bank of the river upstream from the dam.  Madushan village is administratively under Manhao Town (which itself located a few kilometers downstream of the dam) of Gejiu City of Honghe Prefecture; the opposite, right bank of the river is in Jinping Miao, Yao, and Dai Autonomous County of the same Honghe Prefecture.

The primary purpose of the dam is hydroelectric power production and it supports a 300 MW power station. Construction on the dam began in 2007 and its generators were commissioned in 2011.

See also

List of dams and reservoirs in China 
List of tallest dams in China

References

Dams in China
Gravity dams
Dams completed in 2011
Energy infrastructure completed in 2011
Buildings and structures in Honghe Hani and Yi Autonomous Prefecture
Hydroelectric power stations in Yunnan
2011 establishments in China